Lixophaga tenuis is a species of tachinid flies in the genus Lixophaga of the family Tachinidae.

External links

Exoristinae
Insects described in 1959